is a Japanese actor and tarento represented by Kabushikigaisha Gamon and 365.

Kaai's surname is often pronounced as "Kawai."

Filmography

TV series

Films

Direct-to-video

References

External links
 
 

Japanese male actors
Japanese entertainers
Japanese drummers
1975 births
Living people
Actors from Saitama Prefecture
Musicians from Saitama Prefecture
21st-century drummers